Hans Lukaschek (22 May 1885 – 26 January 1960) was a German lawyer and politician.

Lukaschek, born 1885 in Breslau (now known to English speakers by its Polish name, Wrocław), had started his political career in the Catholic Center Party as a mayor and landrat in Upper Silesian Rybnik and Hindenburg (Zabrze).  After the First World War served as German propaganda chief throughout the Upper Silesia plebiscite. Lukaschek headed a committee that investigated all possibilities to engage in plebiscite propaganda. The Silesian Committee was to create common propaganda themes to which all factions could subscribe, and was helped in its task by money from German government. Lukaschek propaganda actions were also sponsored by state finances. He remained in Polish Silesia till 1927, officially as a member of mixed Polish-German Commission organised under the auspice of League of Nations, in secret he organised a spying network for Germany in Polish Upper Silesia during that time. When the network was discovered in years 1926–1927, Polish minister Zaleski asked the commission for cancellation of Lukaschek's position. Lukaschek  offered his resignation in Berlin, after the first attempt was rejected by German state, he offered it second time, stating that he no longer is able to conduct his mission.

He was Oberpräsident (chief administrator) of the Prussian Province of Upper Silesia, in this role he was active against Poles in his region; after a Polish gymnasium was opened in Bytom he issued a letter to German government claiming that it represented a threat to German interests, and ordered close surveillance of both teachers and Polish pupils. As a state official Lukaschek tried to conceal his anti-Polish stance, while discreetly opposing re-approachment between Poles and Germans pursued by some German catholic and pacifist organisations in his region.

He was removed from his offices by the Nazis and, as a lawyer practicing in Breslau joined the anti-Nazi resistance (Kreisauer Kreis) until his imprisonment in 1944/45.
The Nazi court acquitted him in trial
The July 20th plotters who wanted to remove Hitler from power, but also to keep Poland occupied by Germany and restore borders from 1914, planned to make Lukaschek the governor of Silesia.

After the war, Lukaschek joined the Christian Democrates in the Soviet Occupation Zone and became minister in Thuringia before he fled to the Allied occupation zones in 1947 and in April of the following year was appointed vice president of the British and US zones' supreme court. From 1949 to 1953, he was minister for the expellees in West Germany. In August 1952 Lukaschek was reported by British press as saying that Germany's former eastern territories, ' including those occupied by Czechoslovakia will become German again, the paper naming him a "neo-nationalist voice".
He was also an honorary chairman of General Association for the Protection of Officials  an organisations focused on the interests of those who managed to successfully pass the denazification process, and which was engaged in vigorous propaganda on behalf of Germans expelled from Central and Eastern Europe, Lukashek was also engaged in convincing German ministry of finance to provide 350 million marks annually by the West German state for former officials of Nazi Germany.

Sources
Edward Długajczyk  "Afera szpiegowska Hansa Lukaschka z przełomu lat 1926/1927" in Historia i archiwistyka. Studia z dziejów Polski, Polonii i archiwistyki. Księga dedykowana księdzu doktorowi Romanowi Nirowi" editor: Faryś, Janusz  Gorzów Wielkopolski 2004, pp. 71–87
Wywiad polski na Górnym Śląsku 1919-1922 Edward Długajczyk, Muzeum Śląskie, 2001

References

1885 births
1960 deaths
Lawyers from Wrocław
20th-century German judges
Politicians from Wrocław
People from the Province of Silesia
Grand Crosses 1st class of the Order of Merit of the Federal Republic of Germany